The American Broadcasting Company (ABC) is an American commercial broadcast television network. It is the flagship property of the Disney Entertainment division of The Walt Disney Company. The network is headquartered in Burbank, California, on Riverside Drive, directly across the street from Walt Disney Studios and adjacent to the Roy E. Disney Animation Building. The network's secondary offices, and headquarters of its news division, are in New York City, at its broadcast center at 77 West 66th Street on the Upper West Side of Manhattan.

Since 2007, when ABC Radio (also known as Cumulus Media Networks) was sold to Citadel Broadcasting, ABC has reduced its broadcasting operations almost exclusively to television. It is the fifth-oldest major broadcasting network in the world and the youngest of the American Big Three television networks. The network is sometimes referred to as the Alphabet Network, as its initialism also represents the first three letters of the English alphabet, in order.

ABC launched as a radio network in 1943, as the successor to the NBC Blue Network, which had been purchased by Edward J. Noble. It extended its operations to television in 1948, following in the footsteps of established broadcast networks CBS and NBC, as well as the lesser-known DuMont. In the mid-1950s, ABC merged with United Paramount Theatres (UPT), a chain of movie theaters that formerly operated as a subsidiary of Paramount Pictures. Leonard Goldenson, who had been the head of UPT, made the new television network profitable by helping develop and greenlighting many successful series. In the 1980s, after purchasing an 80 percent interest in cable sports channel ESPN, the network's corporate parent, American Broadcasting Companies, Inc., merged with Capital Cities Communications, owner of several print publications, and television and radio stations. Most of Capital Cities/ABC's assets were purchased by Disney in 1996.

ABC has eight owned-and-operated and more than 230 affiliated television stations throughout the United States and its territories. Some ABC-affiliated stations can also be seen in Canada via pay-television providers, and certain other affiliates can also be received over-the-air in areas near the Canada–United States border, although most of its prime time programming is subject to simultaneous substitution regulations for pay television providers imposed by the Canadian Radio-television and Telecommunications Commission (CRTC) to protect rights held by domestically based networks. ABC News provides news and features content for select radio stations owned by Cumulus Media, as these stations are former ABC Radio properties.

History

In 1927, NBC-operated radio network was called the NBC Blue Network. It would later on become an independent radio (and, eventually, television) network known as the American Broadcasting Company (ABC) in 1943. ABC later joined United Paramount Theatres forming American Broadcasting-Paramount Theatres (later American Broadcasting Companies, Inc.). 

After its venture into radio and television throughout the 1960s and 1970s and the purchase of ESPN Inc. in 1982, the company would later be acquired/merged with Capital Cities, forming Capital Cities/ABC in 1986. The company ultimately sold to The Walt Disney Company in 1996.

Programming

The ABC television network provides 89 hours of regularly scheduled network programming each week. In addition, it offers 22 hours of prime-time programming to affiliated stations from 8:00 to 11:00 p.m. Monday through Saturday (Eastern and Pacific Time) and 7:00–11:00 p.m. on Sundays.

Daytime programming is also provided from 11:00 a.m. to 3:00 p.m. Eastern and Pacific weekdays (subtract 1 hour for all other time zones) (with a one-hour break at 12:00 p.m. Eastern/Pacific for stations to air newscasts, locally produced programming or syndicated programs) featuring the talk-lifestyle shows The View and GMA3: What You Need to Know, and the soap opera General Hospital. In addition, ABC News programming includes Good Morning America from 7:00 to 9:00 a.m. weekdays and Saturdays (along with one-hour Sunday editions); nightly editions of ABC World News Tonight (whose weekend editions are occasionally subject to abbreviation or preemption due to sports telecasts overrunning into the program's timeslot), the Sunday political talk show This Week, early morning news programs World News Now and America This Morning and the late-night newsmagazine Nightline. Late nights feature the weeknight talk show Jimmy Kimmel Live!

The network's three-hour Weekend morning children's programming timeslot is programmed by syndication distributor Litton Entertainment, which produces Litton's Weekend Adventure under an arrangement in which the programming block is syndicated exclusively to ABC owned-and-operated and affiliated stations, rather than being leased out directly by the network to Litton.

Daytime

ABC's daytime schedule currently features the talk show The View, news show GMA3, and the soap opera General Hospital. Originally premiering in 1963, General Hospital is ABC's longest-running entertainment program.

In addition to the long-running All My Children (1970–2011) and One Life to Live (1968–2012), notable past soap operas seen on the daytime lineup include Ryan's Hope, Dark Shadows, Loving, The City and Port Charles. ABC also aired the last nine years of the Procter & Gamble-produced soap The Edge of Night, following its cancellation by CBS in 1975. ABC Daytime has also aired a number of game shows, including The Dating Game, The Newlywed Game, Let's Make a Deal, Password, Split Second, The $10,000/$20,000 Pyramid, Family Feud, The Better Sex, Trivia Trap, All-Star Blitz and Hot Streak.

Sports 

Sports programming is provided on occasion, primarily on weekend afternoons. Since 2006, the ABC Sports division has been defunct, with all sports telecasts on ABC being produced in association with sister cable network ESPN under the branding ESPN on ABC. While ABC has, in the past, aired notable sporting events such as the National Football League (NFL)'s Monday Night Football, and various college football bowl games, general industry trends and changes in rights have prompted reductions in sports on broadcast television, with Disney preferring to schedule the majority of its sports rights on the networks of ESPN. This changed in 2020 with occasional simulcasts of ESPN Monday Night Football broadcasts on ABC.

ABC is the broadcast television rightsholder of the National Basketball Association (NBA), with its package (under the NBA on ESPN branding) traditionally beginning with its Christmas Day games, followed by a series of Saturday night and Sunday afternoon games through the remainder of the season, weekend playoff games, and all games of the NBA Finals. ABC is the broadcast television rightsholder of the National Hockey League (NHL), with its package (under the NHL on ESPN branding) beginning with the NHL Thanksgiving Showdown. In this deal, ABC will broadcast up to 10 regular season games (mostly afternoon), the NHL All-Star Game and 4 Stanley Cup Finals. During college football season, ABC typically carries an afternoon doubleheader on Saturdays, along with the primetime Saturday Night Football. ABC also airs coverage of selected bowl games. Beginning in the 2015 NFL season, ESPN agreed to begin simulcasting a wild card playoff game on ABC.

The Saturday afternoon lineup outside of football season typically features airings of ESPN Films documentaries and other studio programs under the banner ESPN Sports Saturday, while Sunday afternoons usually feature either brokered programming, or encore and burn-off airings of ABC programs.

In 2015, ESPN's annual ESPY Awards presentation moved to ABC from ESPN. Bolstered by Caitlyn Jenner accepting the inaugural Arthur Ashe Courage Award during the ceremony, the 2015 ESPY Awards' viewership was roughly tripled over the 2014 ceremony on ESPN.

After the NFL signed a new contract with The Walt Disney Company, ABC will air Super Bowl LXI in 2027. The network has not aired a Super Bowl since Super Bowl XL in 2006.

Specials
ABC currently holds the broadcast rights to the Academy Awards, Emmy Awards, American Music Awards, and the Country Music Association Awards. ABC has also aired the Miss America competition from 1954 to 1956, 1997 to 2005, and 2011 to 2018.

From 2001 to Feb. 2020, ABC held the television rights to most of the Peanuts television specials, having acquired the broadcast rights from CBS, which originated the specials in 1965 with the debut of A Charlie Brown Christmas (other Peanuts specials broadcast annually by ABC, in addition to A Charlie Brown Christmas, include It's the Great Pumpkin, Charlie Brown and A Charlie Brown Thanksgiving). Since 2020, all of the Peanuts TV specials were acquired by Apple TV+ while some of the specials were later moved to PBS under a sub-licensing agreement with Apple. ABC also broadcasts the annual Disney Parks Christmas Day Parade special on Christmas morning.

Since 1974, ABC has generally aired Dick Clark's New Year's Rockin' Eve – a New Year's Eve special featuring music performances and coverage of festivities in New York's Times Square. ABC is also among the broadcasters of the Tournament of Roses Parade (although as mentioned, the Rose Bowl Game now airs exclusively on ESPN as a College Football Playoff "New Year's Six" bowl).

Programming library
ABC owns nearly all of its in-house television and theatrical productions made from the 1970s onward, with the exception of certain co-productions (for example, The Commish is now owned by the estate of its producer, Stephen Cannell). Worldwide video rights are currently owned by various companies; for example, Kino Lorber owns the North American home video rights to the ABC feature film library (along with some lesser known live action films from Disney's library, mostly from Touchstone Pictures, Hollywood Pictures and 20th Century Studios).

When the FCC imposed its Financial Interest and Syndication Rules in 1970, ABC proactively created two companies: Worldvision Enterprises as a syndication distributor, and ABC Circle Films as a production company. However, between the publication and implementation of these regulations, the separation of the network's catalog was made in 1973. The broadcast rights to pre-1973 productions were transferred to Worldvision, which became independent in the same year. The company has been sold several times since Paramount Television acquired it in 1999, and has most recently been absorbed into CBS Media Ventures (formerly CBS Television Distribution), a unit of Paramount Global, which own the competitor CBS. Nonetheless, Worldvision sold portions of its catalog, including the Ruby-Spears and Hanna-Barbera libraries, to Turner Broadcasting System (now a part of Warner Bros. parent company Warner Bros. Discovery) in 1991. With Disney's 1996 purchase of ABC, ABC Circle Films was absorbed into Touchstone Television, a Disney subsidiary which in turn was renamed ABC Studios in 2007.

Also part of the library are most films in the David O. Selznick library, productions from their previous motion picture divisions ABC Pictures International, Selmur Productions, and Palomar Pictures International (before its takeover by Bristol-Myers-Squibb) released by Cinerama Productions (films produced by the company themselves are now under the control of Pacific Theatres), their later theatrical division ABC Motion Pictures, and the in-house productions it continues to produce (such as America's Funniest Home Videos, General Hospital, ABC News productions, and series from Disney Television Studios (ABC Signature and 20th Television). Disney–ABC Domestic Television (formerly known as Buena Vista Television and 20th Television) handles domestic television distribution, while Disney–ABC International Television (formerly known as Buena Vista International Television) handles international television distribution.

Stations
 

Since its inception, ABC has had over 300 television stations that have carried programming from the network at various times throughout its history, including its first two owned-and-operated and affiliated stations, founding O&O WABC-TV and inaugural affiliate WPVI-TV. , ABC has eight owned-and-operated stations, and current and pending affiliation agreements with 236 additional television stations encompassing 50 states, the District of Columbia, four U.S. possessions, Bermuda and Saba. This makes ABC the largest U.S. broadcast television network by total number of affiliates. The network has an estimated national reach of 97.72% of all households in the United States (or 305,347,338 Americans with at least one television set).

Currently, New Jersey, Rhode Island, and Delaware are the only U.S. states where ABC does not have a locally licensed affiliate (New Jersey is served by New York City O&O WABC-TV in the north half of the state and Philadelphia O&O WPVI-TV in the south; Rhode Island is served by New Bedford, Massachusetts-licensed WLNE, though outside of the transmitter, all other operations for the station are based in Providence; and Delaware is served by WPVI in the northern two thirds and Salisbury, Maryland, affiliate WMDT in the southern third of the state). ABC maintains affiliations with low-power stations (broadcasting either in analog or digital) in a few markets, such as Birmingham, Alabama (WBMA-LD), Lima, Ohio (WPNM-LD) and South Bend, Indiana (WBND-LD). In some markets, including the former two mentioned, these stations also maintain digital simulcasts on a subchannel of a co-owned/co-managed full-power television station.

The network has the unusual distinction of having separately owned-and-operated affiliates which serve the same market in Tampa, Florida (WFTS-TV and WWSB), Boston, Massachusetts (WCVB-TV and WMUR-TV), Lincoln, Nebraska (KLKN and KHGI-TV), and Grand Rapids, Michigan (WZZM and WOTV), with an analogous situation arising in Kansas City, Missouri (KMBC-TV and KQTV). KQTV is licensed to St. Joseph, which Nielsen designates as a separate market from Kansas City, despite a mere  distance between the two cities and the Kansas City-based stations (including KMBC) providing better city-grade to Grade B coverage to the area compared to the signals of the primary ABC affiliates in the other aforementioned dual-affiliate markets. (KQTV was St. Joseph's lone major network affiliate until 2011, when locally based News-Press & Gazette Company began establishing low-power affiliates of ABC's four English-language competitors and Telemundo on three low-power stations to end St. Joseph's dependence on Kansas City.) WWSB, KHGI and WOTV, meanwhile, serve areas that do not receive an adequate signal from their market's primary ABC affiliate. (Of note, ABC initially affiliated with WWSB to cover southern portions of the Tampa–St. Petersburg market—including WWSB's city of license, Sarasota—as the transmitters of WTSP, the market's former primary ABC affiliate from 1965 to 1994, and Miami affiliate WPLG had been short-spaced to avoid interference between their respective analog-VHF channel 10 signals; WWSB remained an ABC affiliate after its Tampa affiliation moved from WTSP to WFTS in December 1994, even though WFTS's signal reaches Sarasota and some surrounding areas.) WCVB-TV is licensed to Boston while WMUR-TV is licensed to Manchester, New Hampshire (which is officially part of the Boston market). WCVB is easily receivable in Manchester with a good antenna as well as having its own news department that covers New Hampshire; it is the only station licensed to the state that does such. Both WCVB and WMUR are owned by Hearst Television.

The Sinclair Broadcast Group is the largest operator of ABC stations by numerical total, owning or providing services to 28 full, primary ABC affiliates and two subchannel-only affiliates. Sinclair owns the largest ABC subchannel affiliate by market size, WABM-DT2/WDBB-DT2 in the Birmingham market, which serve as repeaters of WBMA-LD (which itself is also simulcast on a subchannel of former WBMA satellite WGWW, owned by Sinclair partner company Howard Stirk Holdings). The E. W. Scripps Company is the largest operator of ABC stations in terms of overall market reach, owning 15 ABC-affiliated stations (including affiliates in larger markets such as Cleveland, Phoenix, Detroit and Denver), and through its ownership of Phoenix affiliate KNXV, Las Vegas affiliate KTNV-TV and Tucson affiliate KGUN-TV, it is the only provider of ABC programming for the majority of Arizona (outside the Yuma-El Centro market) and Southern Nevada. Scripps also owns and operates several ABC stations in the Mountain and Pacific time zones, including in Denver, San Diego, Bakersfield, California, and Boise, Idaho, and when combined with the ABC-owned stations in Los Angeles, Fresno, and San Francisco, the affiliations from the News-Press & Gazette Company in Santa Barbara, Palm Springs, Yuma-El Centro, and Colorado Springs-Pueblo, and Sinclair's affiliations in Seattle and Portland, Oregon, these four entities control the access of ABC network programming in most of the Western United States, particularly in terms of audience reach.

Facilities and studios
All of ABC's owned-and-operated stations and affiliates have had their own facilities and studios, but transverse entities have been created to produce national programming. As a result, television series were produced by ABC Circle Films beginning in 1962 and by Touchstone Television beginning in 1985, before Touchstone was reorganized as ABC Studios in February 2007 and later renamed to its current name ABC Signature in August 2020. Since the 1950s, ABC has had two main production facilities: the ABC Television Center (now The Prospect Studios) on Prospect Avenue in Hollywood, California, shared with the operations of KABC-TV until 1999; and the ABC Television Center, East, a set of studios located throughout New York City.

In addition to the headquarters building on Riverside Drive, other ABC facilities in Burbank include a building at 3800 West Alameda, known as 'Burbank Center', which is primarily associated with Walt Disney Television and functions as the headquarters and broadcast center for Disney Channel, Disney Junior, Disney XD, Freeform, FX, National Geographic, and Radio Disney. Additionally, Disney Television Animation has a facility on Empire Avenue near the Hollywood Burbank Airport. In nearby Glendale, Disney/ABC also maintains the Grand Central Creative Campus, which houses other company subsidiaries, including the studios of KABC-TV and the Los Angeles bureau of ABC News.

ABC owns several facilities in New York grouped mainly on West 66th Street, with the main set of facilities on the corner of Columbus Avenue. This main set of buildings includes:
 77 West 66th Street, a 22-story building built in 1988 on a  plot;
 A pair of buildings at 147–155 Columbus Avenue (ten and seven stories) connected by glass bays, constructed on a  plot;
 30 West 67th Street, a 15-story building with a facade on 67th Street on a  plot;
 55 West 67th Street, the former First Battery of the New York National Guard, a five-story building on a  plot.
ABC also owns 7, 17 and 47 West 66th Street, three buildings on a  plot.

Disney formerly leased  at 157 Columbus Avenue, on the other side of 67th Street.

ABC also owns the Times Square Studios at 1500 Broadway, on land owned by a development fund for the 42nd Street Project. Opened in 1999, Good Morning America is broadcast from this facility. ABC News has premises on West 66th Street, in a six-story building occupying a  plot at 121–135 West End Avenue. The block of West 66th street between Central Park West and Columbus Ave. which houses the ABC News building was renamed Peter Jennings Way in 2006 in honor of the then-recently deceased news anchor.

On July 9, 2018, the Walt Disney Company announced that it was selling its two West 66th Street campuses (except for the National Guard Amory) to Silverstein Properties and purchasing one square block of property in lower Manhattan to build a new New York-based broadcast center.

Related services

Video-on-demand services
ABC maintains several video-on-demand (VOD) services for delayed viewing of the network's programming, including a traditional VOD service called ABC on Demand, which is carried on most traditional cable and IPTV providers. The Walt Disney Company is also a part-owner of Hulu, and has offered full-length episodes of most of ABC's programming through this streaming service since July 6, 2009.

In May 2013, ABC launched "WatchABC", a revamp of its traditional multi-platform streaming services encompassing the network's existing streaming portal at ABC.com and a mobile app for smartphones and tablet computers. This service provides full-length episodes of ABC programs and live streams of local affiliates in select markets (this was the first such offering by a U.S. broadcast network). However, live streams are only available to authenticated subscribers of participating pay television providers. WABC-TV New York and WPVI-TV Philadelphia were the first stations to offer streams of their programming on the service, with the six remaining ABC O&Os offering streams by the start of the 2013–14 season. Hearst Television also reached a deal to offer streams of its ABC affiliates on the service, though  these stations are only available for live-streaming for DirecTV subscribers.

In November 2015, it was reported that ABC had been developing a slate of original digital series for the WatchABC service, internally codenamed ABC3. In July 2016, ABC re-launched its streaming platforms, dropping the WatchABC brand, adding a streaming library of 38 classic ABC series, and introducing 7 original short-form series under the blanket branding ABCd.

The most recent episodes of the network's shows are usually made available on the ABC app, Hulu and ABC on Demand the day after their original broadcast. In addition, ABC on Demand disallows fast forwarding of accessed content.

ABC HD

ABC's master feed is transmitted in 720p high-definition, the native resolution format for The Walt Disney Company's American television properties. However, most of Hearst Television's ABC-affiliated stations and some of Tegna's ABC affiliates transmit the network's programming in 1080i, while 11 other affiliates owned by various companies carry the network feed in 480i standard definition either due to technical considerations for affiliates of other major networks that carry ABC programming on a digital subchannel or because a primary feed ABC affiliate has not yet upgraded their transmission equipment to allow content to be presented in HD. Although ABC has not fully transitioned to 1080p or ultra HD, some stations such as ABC affiliate station KNXV-TV in Phoenix, Arizona, transmit the network's programming at 1080p via an ATSC 3.0 multiplex stations, such as KASW with KNXV-TV.

ABC began its conversion to high definition with the launch of its simulcast feed, ABC HD, on September 16, 2001, at the start of the 2001–02 season, with its scripted prime-time series becoming the first shows to upgrade to the format, the simulcast feed was launched first on ABC's owned television stations that same date with many major affiliates following after that. Both new and returning scripted series were broadcast in high definition. In 2011, Extreme Makeover: Home Edition was the last program on the network's schedule that was broadcast in 4:3 standard definition. All of the network's new programming has been presented in HD since January 2012. The affiliate-syndicated Saturday morning educational and informative (E/I) block Litton's Weekend Adventure was the first children's program block on U.S. network television to feature programs available in HD upon its September 2011 debut. The HD programming is broadcast in 5.1 surround sound.

On September 1, 2016, ABC began to use 16:9 framing for its most graphical imaging (primarily the network's bug, in-program promotions and generic closing credit sequences as well as sports telecasts, where the BottomLine and scoreboard elements now extend outside the 4:3 frame), requiring its stations and pay television providers to display its programming in a compulsory widescreen format, either in high definition or standard definition. With this change, some programs also began positioning their main on-screen credits outside the 4:3 aspect ratio.

Visual identity

The ABC logo has evolved many times since the network's creation in 1943. The network's first logo, introduced in 1946, consisted of a television screen containing the letters "T" and "V", with a vertical ABC microphone in the center, referencing the network's roots in radio. When the ABC-UPT merger was finalized in 1953, the network introduced a new logo based on the FCC seal, with the letters "ABC" enclosed in a circular shield surmounted by a bald eagle. In 1957, just before the television network began its first color broadcasts, the ABC logo consisted of a tiny lowercase "abc" in the center of a large lowercase letter a, a design known as the ABC Circle A.

In 1962, graphic designer Paul Rand redesigned the ABC logo into its current and best-known form, with the lowercase letters "abc" enclosed in a single black circle. The new logo debuted on-air on October 19 of the same year, but it was not until the following spring that it was fully adopted. The letters are strongly reminiscent of the Bauhaus typeface designed by Herbert Bayer in the 1920s, but also share similarities with several other fonts, such as ITC Avant Garde and Horatio, and most closely resembling Chalet. The logo's simplicity made it easier to redesign and duplicate, which was beneficial before the advent of computer graphics. A color version of the logo was also developed around 1963, and animated as a brief 10-second intro to be shown before the then-small handful of network programs broadcast in color (similar to the NBC "Laramie" peacock intro used during that era). The "a" was rendered in red, the "b" in blue, and the "c" in green, against the same single black circle. A variant of this color logo, with the colored letters against a white circle, was also commonly used throughout the 1960s.

The 1970s and 1980s saw the emergence of many graphical imaging packages for the network which based the logo's setting mainly on special lighting effects then under development including white, blue, pink, rainbow neon, and glittering dotted lines. Among the ABC Circle logo's many variants was a 1977 ID sequence that featured a bubble on a black background representing the circle with glossy gold letters, and was the first ABC identification card to simulate a three-dimensional appearance.

In 1983, for the 40th anniversary of the network's founding, ID sequences had the logo appear in a gold CGI design on a blue background, accompanied by the slogan "That Special Feeling" in a script font. Ten years later, in 1993, the "ABC Circle" logo reverted to its classic white-on-black color scheme, but with gloss effects on both the circle and the letters, and a bronze border surrounding the circle. The ABC logo first appeared as an on-screen bug in the 1993–94 season, appearing initially only for 60 seconds at the beginning of an act or segment, then appearing throughout programs beginning in the 1995–96 season; the respective iterations of the translucent logo bug were also incorporated within program promotions until the 2011–12 season.

During the 1998–99 season, the network began using a minimalist graphical identity with a yellow and black motif, designed by Pittard Sullivan, featuring a small black-and-white "ABC Circle" logo on a yellow background (promotions during this time also featured a sequence of still photos of the stars of its programs during the timeslot card as well as the schedule sequence that began each night's prime time lineup). A new four-note theme tune was introduced alongside the package, based around the network's then-new "We Love TV" image campaign from the 1998–99 season, creating an audio signature in comparative parlance to the NBC chimes, CBS's various four-note sound marks (including the current version introduced in 1992) and the Fox Fanfare. The four-note signature has been updated with every television season thereafter until 2020–21 season.

In 2000, ABC launched a web-based promotional campaign focused around its circle logo, also called 'the dot', in which comic book character Little Dot prompted visitors to "download the dot", a program which would cause the ABC logo to fly around the screen and settle in the bottom-right corner. The network hired the Troika Design Group to design and produce its 2001–02 identity, which continued using the black-and-yellow coloring of the logo and featured dots and stripes in various promotional and identification spots.

On June 16, 2007, ABC began to phase in a new imaging campaign for the upcoming 2007–08 season, "Start Here", accompanied by a glassy version of the ABC logo. Also developed by Troika, marketing used a series of icons intended to emphasize the availability of ABC content across multiple platforms, and sought to "simplify and bring a lot more consistency and continuity to the visual representation of ABC". On-air, the logo was accompanied by animated water and ribbon effects. Red ribbons were used to represent the entertainment division, while blue ribbons were used for ABC News. 

ABC introduced a revision to its logo and branding by LoyalKaspar for the 2013–14 season; the logo carried a simpler gloss design than the 2007 version, and had lettering closer-resembling Paul Rand's original version of the circle logo. A custom typeface inspired by the ABC logotype, ABC Modern, was also created for use in advertising and other promotional elements. The logo was used in various color schemes, with a gold version used primarily for ABC's entertainment divisions, a red version used primarily for ESPN on ABC, steel blue and dark grey versions used primarily by ABC News, and all four colors used interchangeably in promotions.

Upon a reimaging by The New Blank for the 2018–19 season, the blue, red, and yellow variants were dropped, with the dark grey version becoming ABC's main logo. Surrounding promotional elements adopted a circular "echo" motif and the new slogan "America's Network".

Another revision to the logo was introduced on August 9, 2021, ahead of the 2021–22 season. Designed by Trollbäck & Company, it is designed to adhere to flat design trends, and returns to a solid, two-dimensional design with smaller and bolder lettering. The main logo is rendered in a dark, blue-gray color; outlined and black-on-red variations are also used, such as for the on-screen bug and promotional usage respectively.

The Circle 7 logo, designed in 1962, is also commonly associated with ABC affiliates who broadcast on channel 7, including its flagship local stations WABC-TV (New York City), KABC-TV (Los Angeles), KGO-TV (San Francisco) and WLS-TV (Chicago). This logo was intended to be used somewhat interchangeably by these stations with the main circular network logo and has itself also become an iconic symbol of the ABC network. KGO was the first of the ABC-owned stations to use the Circle 7 logo, starting on August 27, 1962; by the end of the year, the other ABC-owned stations began using the logo, and have continued to do so since.

International development
The first attempts to internationalize the ABC television network dates to the 1950s, when Goldenson tried to use the same strategies he had in expanding UPT's theater operation to the international market. Goldenson said that ABC's first international activity was broadcasting the coronation of Queen Elizabeth II in June 1953; CBS and NBC were delayed in covering the coronation due to flight delays. Goldenson tried international investing, having ABC invest in stations in the Latin American market, acquiring a 51% interest in a network covering Central America and in 1959 established program distributor Worldvision Enterprises. Goldenson also cited interest in Japan in the early 1950s, acquiring a 5% stake in two new domestic networks, the Mainichi Broadcasting System in 1951 and TV Asahi in 1957. Goldenson also invested in broadcasting properties in Beirut in the mid-1960s.

The goal was to create a network of wholly and partially owned channels and affiliates to rebroadcast the network's programs. In 1959, this rerun activity was completed with program syndication, with ABC Films selling programs to networks not owned by ABC. The arrival of satellite television ended the need for ABC to hold interests in other countries; many governments also wanted to increase their independence and strengthen legislation to limit foreign ownership of broadcasting properties. As a result, ABC was forced to sell all of its interests in international networks, mainly in Japan and Latin America, in the 1970s.

The second period of international expansion is linked to that of the ESPN network in the 1990s, and policies enacted in the 2000s by Disney Media Networks. These policies included the expansion of several of the company's U.S.-based cable networks including Disney Channel and its spinoffs Toon Disney, Playhouse Disney and Jetix; although Disney also sold its 33% stake in European sports channel Eurosport for $155 million in June 2000. In contrast to Disney's other channels, ABC broadcasts in the United States with programming syndicated in other countries. The policy regarding wholly owned international networks was revived and on September 27, 2004, ABC announced the launch of ABC1, a free-to-air channel in the United Kingdom owned by the ABC Group. However, ABC1 could not attain sustainable viewership and was shut down in October 2007.

Prior to the ABC1 closure, on October 10, 2006, Disney–ABC Television Group entered into an agreement with satellite provider Dish TV to carry its ABC News Now channel in India. However, this operation was not put into effect.

Australia
In Australia, the Nine Network maintained close ties with ABC and has used a majority of the U.S. network's image campaigns and slogans since the 1970s; in particular, "Still the One", ABC's slogan it adopted for the 1977–78 television season and again for the 1979–80 television season, was adopted by Nine for the 1978 Australian television season (before, Nine also used ABC's "Let Us Be the One" slogan), and lasted longer ever since it was re-adopted in 1980—it was Nine's main slogan until it was replaced in December 2006, only to be reintroduced in November 2021. ABC's other slogans were also adopted by Nine during the 1980–2006 period, as secondary slogans complementing the "Still the One" slogan.

Canada
Most Canadians have access to at least one U.S.-based ABC affiliate, either over-the-air (in areas located within proximity of the Canada–United States border) or through a cable, satellite or IPTV provider. Most ABC programs are subject to simultaneous substitution regulations imposed by the CRTC, which require television service providers to replace an American station's signal with the feed of a Canadian broadcaster carrying the same syndicated program to protect domestic programming rights and advertising revenue.

Mexico
Like Canada, ABC programming is available in Mexico through free-to-air affiliates in markets located within proximity to the Mexico–United States border whose signals are readily receivable over-the-air in border areas of northern Mexico.

Film production

See also

 ABC Family Worldwide
 ABC Kids
 ABC Productions
 ABC Signature
 Children's programming on the American Broadcasting Company
 Lists of ABC television affiliates
 List of United States over-the-air television networks
 Litton's Weekend Adventure
 Walt Disney Television

Footnotes

References

Further reading

External links

 
 Unofficial history of ABC's East Coast production facilities and West Coast production facilities

 
Television networks in the United States
Disney Media Networks
Entertainment companies based in New York City
Mass media companies based in New York City
Disney acquisitions
Disney television networks
The Walt Disney Company subsidiaries
American companies established in 1943
Radio stations established in 1943
Television channels and stations established in 1943
1943 establishments in New York City
1996 mergers and acquisitions
1943 establishments in the United States